The 12995 Bandra Terminus–Udaipur Express is a Superfast train of Indian Railways running between  in Mumbai and  in Rajasthan.

It is currently being operated with 12995/12996 train numbers on tri-weekly basis.

Coaches

The train has standard ICF rakes with max speed of 110 kmph. The train consists of the following coaches:

 AC II Tier
 AC III Tier
 Sleeper Coaches
 General Unreserved
 Seating cum Luggage Rake

As with most train services in India, coach composition may be amended at the discretion of Indian Railways depending on demand.

Service

 12995 Bandra Terminus–Udaipur Express covers the distance of 945 kilometres in 16 hours 40 mins (57 km/hr).
 12996 Udaipur–Bandra Terminus Express covers the distance of 945 kilometres in 16 hours 45 mins (56 km/hr).

As the average speed of the train is above 55 km/hr, as per Indian Railways rules, its fare includes a Superfast surcharge.

Route & Halts 

The important halts of the train are:

Schedule

Traction

This train is hauled by a Ratlam / Abu Road-based WDM-3A from Udaipur City till  after which a Bhagat Ki Kothi-based WDP-4D takes over until  after which a Vadodara-based WAP-4E hauls the train until Bandra Terminus.

References

Transport in Mumbai
Transport in Udaipur
Rail transport in Maharashtra
Rail transport in Gujarat
Rail transport in Madhya Pradesh
Rail transport in Rajasthan
Express trains in India